Viola jooi, the Carpathian violet or Transylvanian violet, is a species of flowering plant in the family Violaceae, native to Romania and Ukraine. It is a relict species of calcicolous rock outcrops.

References

jooi
Flora of Romania
Flora of Ukraine
Plants described in 1857